Maurice Bertie Lawson (28 February 1885 – 8 August 1961) was an English cricketer. Lawson was a right-handed batsman who bowled right-arm fast-medium.

Lawson made his first-class debut for Hampshire in the 1907 County Championship against Somerset. Lawson played five matches for Hampshire in the 1907 season.

Lawson next played for Hampshire two years later in 1909 against Gloucestershire.

Ten years after his last first-class appearance, Lawson represented Hampshire in what was to be his final first-class match against Kent in the 1919 County Championship, the first since the end of the First World War. This was Lawson's only appearance during that season.

Lawson died at Alton, Hampshire on 8 August 1961.

Family
Lawson's son, Howard Lawson also represented Hampshire in first-class cricket.

External links
Maurice Lawson at Cricinfo
Maurice Lawson at CricketArchive

1885 births
1961 deaths
People from Christchurch, Dorset
Cricketers from Dorset
English cricketers
Hampshire cricketers